"Bring 'Em All In" is a song from Scottish singer-songwriter Mike Scott, which was released as the lead single from his first solo album Bring 'Em All In. It was written by Mike Scott, and produced by Scott and Niko Bolas. The song reached No. 56 in the UK Singles Chart and remained in the Top 100 for two weeks.

Critical reception
On its release, Music & Media wrote: "Going for a world record straightaway: ex-Waterboy Scott sings the word "bring" 66 times on this passionate folk song." In a review of Bring 'Em All Inn, The Guardian commented: "Scott's lyrics are too soul-bearing for comfort but he can write a good tune - the title track, in particular, is deserving of a very wide audience." Neil McKay of Sunday Life considered the song to be "haunting", with a "gorgeously simple melody".

Diana Valois of The Morning Call wrote: "The title cut is a terse taunt rumble of guitar with plenty of drama as Scott shepherds the title chant from a whispered plea to a gravelly command. While Scott isn't a "Christian artist," this cut, which winds into a hushed, church-like chorus, has the right sentiment and edge to cross over." Sandra Schulman of the South Florida Sun Sentinel described the song as "sound[ing] like the song of a savior, requesting all the good, evil and in-between to come into his heart for shelter." Kevin O'Hare, writing for the Newhouse News Service, described the song as "kick[ing] the [album] off in hypnotic and promising fashion".

Formats

Personnel
 Mike Scott - vocals, all instruments, producer
 Niko Bolas - producer, recording, engineer, mixing

Other
 Stefano Giovannini - cover photography
 Mike Scott - cover concept
 Stylorouge - design

Charts

References

1995 songs
1995 singles
Chrysalis Records singles
Songs written by Mike Scott (musician)
Song recordings produced by Mike Scott (musician)
Song recordings produced by Niko Bolas